Fairhaven was a sternwheel steamboat of the Puget Sound Mosquito Fleet which operated from 1889 to 1918.

Career
Fairhaven was built in 1889 by John J. Holland for the Pacific Navigation Company in his shipyard at Tacoma, Washington.  The vessel was placed on the run from Seattle, to Bellingham, Washington, by way of Whidbey Island and the town of La Conner, Washington.

In March 1907, Fairhaven was blown onto the dock at Coupeville, Washington, during a gale, and then on to the shore, suffering substantial damage. The steamboat Camano towed her off the beach.

On November 3, 1911, Fairhaven sank at her mooring in Seattle.  She was raised, but was destroyed by fire in 1918.

Gallery

References

 Affleck, Edwin L, ed. A Century of Paddlewheelers in the Pacific Northwest, the Yukon, and Alaska, Alexander Nicholls Press, Vancouver, BC (2000) 

1889 ships
Steamboats of Washington (state)
Passenger ships of the United States
Puget Sound Navigation Company
Maritime incidents in 1907
Maritime incidents in 1911
Maritime incidents in 1918
Shipwrecks of the Washington coast
Ship fires
November 1911 events